Hakea standleyensis is a small flowering shrub in the family Proteaceae. It has white flowers, needle-shaped leaves and a twisted growth habit. It grows on cliff ledges in the Northern Territory, Australia.

Description
The smaller branches and young leaves have dense silky hairs quickly becoming smooth.

Taxonomy and naming
Hakea standleyensis was first formally described in 1973 by John Maconchie who published the description in Transactions of the Royal Society of South Australia.  Named after Standley Chasm in the Macdonnell Ranges one of the localities where it is found.

Distribution and habitat
Hakea standleyensis is restricted  to the Macdonnell Ranges in the Northern Territory where it grows in skeletal soil on ledges of quartzite cliff faces.

Conservation status
Hakea standleyensis is considered 'Rare' in J.D.Briggs & J.H.Leigh, Rare or Threatened Australian Plants (1995).

References

standleyensis
Flora of the Northern Territory
Plants described in 1973